Georgia State Route 3S may refer to:

 Georgia State Route 3S (Marietta): A former state highway that traveled in Marietta
 Georgia State Route 3S (Thomaston): A former state highway that traveled in Thomaston

0003S